Murl K. Aten (August 13, 1901June 15, 1971) was a Michigan politician who served as Michigan Auditor General from 1947 to 1950.

Early life
Aten was born on August 13, 1901 in Norvell, Michigan.

Career
Aten served as Jackson County clerk from 1939 to 1940. He then served as the Jackson County Prosecuting Attorney from 1945 to 1946. Aten served as Michigan Auditor General from 1947 to 1950. In 1950, Aten was an unsuccessful candidate in the Republican primary the position of United States Representative from Michigan's 2nd District.

Personal life
Aten was married and had three children. Aten was a member of the Kiwanis, the Freemasons, and of the Loyal Order of Moose. Aten was Methodist.

Death
Aten died of a heart attack near his home on June 15, 1971 in Sandstone Township, Michigan. He was interred at Roseland Memorial Gardens in Jackson, Michigan.

References

1901 births
1971 deaths
Michigan Auditors General
American Freemasons
Methodists from Michigan
20th-century Methodists
Michigan Republicans
Michigan lawyers
Burials in Michigan
20th-century American politicians
20th-century American lawyers